Notre-Dame-des-Pins is a parish municipality in the Beauce-Sartigan Regional County Municipality in the Chaudière-Appalaches region of Quebec, Canada. Its population is 1,812 as of the Canada 2021 Census.

Notre-Dame-des-Pins is known for its covered bridge crossing the Chaudière River. Built in 1928 and opened in 1929, it is 146 m long. It is the longest of its kind in Quebec and the second longest in Canada.

Toponymy
When the municipality was founded, in 1926, the original name was Notre-Dame-de-la-Providence. Since the name never really established itself in local usage, it was changed to Notre-Dame-des-Pins in 1978.

Demographics 

References

Commission de toponymie du Québec
Ministère des Affaires municipales, des Régions et de l'Occupation du territoire

Incorporated places in Chaudière-Appalaches
Parish municipalities in Quebec